Alfredo Cipriano Carlomagno (born 5 October 1917) is an Argentine former boxer who competed in the 1936 Summer Olympics in Berlin. In 1936 he finished fourth in the flyweight class. He lost in his semifinal to Willy Kaiser and was not able to compete in the bronze-medal bout with Louis Laurie.

1936 Olympic results
 Round of 32: bye
 Round of 16: defeated Chiyoto Nakano (Japan) on points
 Quarterfinal: defeated William Passmore (South Africa) on points
 Semifinal: lost to Willy Kaiser (Germany) on points
 Bronze-medal bout: lost to Louis Laurie (United States) by walkover

External links
Alfredo Carlomagno's profile at Sports Reference.com
  

1917 births
Possibly living people
Flyweight boxers
Olympic boxers of Argentina
Boxers at the 1936 Summer Olympics
Argentine male boxers